Ballynoe Stone Circle is a late Neolithic to Early Bronze Age  stone circle located near the village of Ballynoe, County Down in Northern Ireland. It is one of around 1,300 recorded stone circles in the British Isles and Brittany.

History
Stone circles are circular arrangements of standing stones, dating from the late Neolithic era through the Early Bronze Age. Monuments were constructed from 3300 to 900 BCE. They are commonly found throughout Britain, Ireland and Brittany. In Ireland, the monuments are distributed primarily in County Cork, County Kerry and in central Ulster. In Ulster, the typical stone circle is constructed of a large number of small stones, usually 0.3 m high, and are often found at higher elevations. Stone circles are relative scarce in County Down, compared to other regions of Ulster. There are more than 1300 surviving stone circles in Britain, Ireland, and Brittany today. The original purpose for stone circles in unknown, but many archaeologists believe that they were used for multiple purposes, including burials, religious or ceremonial purposes, and community gatherings. It has also been suggested that the stones were situated in relation to meaningful solar and lunar alignments.

Description
The Ballynoe stone circle is located near the village of Ballynoe, County Down, in Northern Ireland.  
Inside the circle is a long low partly kerbed mound lying east–west. It originally held two burial cists with cremated human remains, one at each end of the mound. The mound has similar (two end burial chambers) features to the Audleystown Court Tomb. The mound was most likely added in a later building phase. The entrance is perfectly lined up with the setting sun, on March 21 of each year, which is the half-way point between midwinter and midsummer.

In the British Isles, stone circles with entrances originated in Cumbria and were constructed as far north as western Scotland, as far south as southeast England and as far west as Northern Ireland. The earliest of these stone circles in Ireland  was built in Ballynoe. The Ballynoe monument underwent a number of building phases, beginning in the late Neolithic and continuing into the Early Bronze Age. There may have been up to 70 original stones in the circle, made of local rock.

See also
Callanish Stones
Prehistoric Ireland
List of archaeological sites in County Down
List of megalithic monuments in Ireland

References

Stone circles in Northern Ireland
Archaeological sites in County Down